William John Brown (25 December 1896 – 23 August 1977) was a Scottish professional footballer. He was born in Larne, although of Scottish descent, returning to Dundee in 1901.

Brown, a full-back, played for a local junior side Dundee North End F.C before joining Welsh side Llanelli for the 1922–23 season. He moved to Rochdale in 1923, making his debut in the opening game of 1923–24, a 2–0 home win against Durham. Bill played 178 league games for Rochdale without finding the net and completed a run of 85 successive games toward the end of the 26/27 season. He was part of the Rochdale side which defeated Chesterfield 8-1 during the same campaign, a club record which stands today. Originally a left back he was switched to the right back position during this period. However, after a loss to New Brighton the following season he was dropped and subsequently released after 5 years with the club. His last match was a 1–0 home win against Doncaster on 5 May 1928.

Brown joined Torquay United in 1928. He started the first game of the 1928–29 season, a 4–3 defeat at home to Queens Park Rangers. He did however struggle to establish himself and left Plainmoor, after playing 16 times, to join Dundalk after losing his place in defence to Sid Cann. Following his career Bill returned to Dundee.

References

19th-century births
Footballers from Dundee
Scottish footballers
Dundee North End F.C. players
Rochdale A.F.C. players
Torquay United F.C. players
League of Ireland players
1977 deaths
Dundalk F.C. players
English Football League players
Llanelli Town A.F.C. players
Association football fullbacks
Dundee F.C. players